Jonathan Henry Lyle CB (born February 1959) is a British engineer and former senior civil servant.  He served as chief executive of Dstl between March 2012 and September 2017.

Biography  
After an initial post with the Ministry of Defence in Portsdown he worked in the maritime sector in Bath. In 1989 Lyle moved to London and undertook a number of cost and investment studies for future aircraft systems.  He moved to the Office of Science and Technology at the Cabinet Office in 1991 and returned to defence procurement in 1996.

Lyle was promoted to the senior civil service in 2000 and appointed leader of the Future Offensive Air System Integrated Project Team (IPT).  He was then promoted in 2004 to lead the Defence Procurement Agency's aircraft, helicopter and weapons projects.  When the DPA was merged into the Defence Equipment and Support agency in 2007 Lyle was appointed Director General - Helicopters.

Lyle was also Director of the College of Management and Technology at the Defence Academy, Shrivenham during 2008 and 2009 and Head of the Royal Corps of Naval Constructors between 2007 and 2011. His final post in Civil Service was as Chief Executive (DG), Dstl, between 2012-17.

Lyle was appointed Companion of the Order of the Bath (CB) in the 2017 Birthday Honours.

See also
Dstl

References

Living people
1959 births
British civil servants
British marine engineers
Fellows of the Institution of Engineering and Technology
Companions of the Order of the Bath
Date of birth missing (living people)
People from Salisbury